In the United States, tornadoes have occurred every single day of the year and strong or violent tornadoes (rated F2/EF2 or greater) have been recorded on multiple occasions each month.

While this is not an exhaustive list of significant tornadoes, it includes tornadic events for each calendar day with an emphasis on storms that have occurred in North America. As tornadoes have occurred on every continent except Antarctica, significant tornadoes from other continents are also included on this list when they can be confirmed via reputable media or government agency.

Tornadoes on this list were included because of extraordinary or extreme characteristics (e.g. strength, damage, fatalities) or historical significance (including special scientific or human interest stories).

Color Guide 
 North America

 South America

 Europe

 Asia

 Africa

 Oceania

January

February

March

April

May

June

July

August

September

October

November

December

See also

 Derecho
 Enhanced Fujita scale (used in the United States from 2007 through the present day)
 List of F5 and EF5 tornadoes
 List of F4 and EF4 tornadoes
 List of F4 and EF4 tornadoes (2010–2019)
 List of F4 and EF4 tornadoes (2020–present)
 List of tornadoes and tornado outbreaks
 List of tornado events by year
 Supercell thunderstorm
 Ted Fujita, creator of the original Fujita Scale (used in the United States from 1971 to 2007)
 Thomas P. Grazulis
 Tornado climatology

References

External links
 The Tornado Project
 Tornado Map Project
 GenDisasters
 Storm Prediction Center WCM Page
 SPC Severe Weather Event Summaries
 NCDC Storm Events Database
 Storm Data
 Bangladesh and East India Tornado Prediction Site (Jonathan Finch)
 The Weather Doctor's Almanac (Keith C. Heidorn)

by day of year